Venari Resources LLC, was a privately held offshore exploration and production company founded in 2012 by Brian Reinsborough, was focused on the oil-prone subsalt region in the Gulf of Mexico’s deep waters. In May 2012, global private equity investment firms Warburg Pincus, Kelso & Company, Temasek Holdings and The Jordan Company provided an initial $1.125 billion capital commitment  so Venari can pursue its exploration program and development projects in the Gulf of Mexico.

In December 2019, Talos executed a purchase and sale agreement and closed on the acquisition of all primary term acreage and prospects from Venari Resources. The company website indicates that the company will cease operations in early 2020.

Current Assets 
Since formation, Venari has built a large inventory of drillable prospects and leases in the Gulf of Mexico, including the Coronado discovery  and potentially giant Shenandoah discovery  in the Walker Ridge area.

Office Locations 
The company is headquartered in Dallas and has an additional office location in the Houston Energy Corridor. As of June 3, 2013, Venari had 34 employees.

References

External links 
Official website

Energy companies established in 2012
American companies established in 2012
Companies based in Dallas
Companies based in Houston
Defunct oil companies of the United States